The Tree of Peace Society was founded in 1984 and incorporated in New York State on October 17, 1994, as a "foreign" not-for-profit corporation ("foreign" a legal formality owing to tribal sovereignty considerations). Its headquarters are located on the Akwesasne Mohawk reservation in Hogansburg, New York, which borders the provinces of Quebec and Ontario, Canada, along the St. Lawrence River.

Since 1984, society members, headed by founder Chief Jake Swamp have ceremoniously planted trees in significant public places, such as near Philadelphia's Constitution Hall in 1986 and on April 10, 1986, at Shasta Hall, California State University, Sacramento, California The organization's official website explains the ancient Native American legend behind the group's work:

The educational website Past is Prologue  contains an article explaining more about how and why Trees of Peace are planted by the group:...Chief Jake Swamp of the Mohawk Nation and co-director of the Tree of Peace Society travels around the world planting Trees of Peace, including on the Smithsonian Mall during the Bicentennial celebration in honor of the contributions to the U.S. Constitution which came from the Iroquois Great Law of Peace. Such traditional ceremonies cannot, of course, be replicated by non-Iroquois...Suggestions for Ceremony: Call the group together with music.  If a Native American drumming (much of which is sacred) group is available in your area, this would be appropriate.  Form a circle around the tree.  Readings could include The Great Tree of Peace from Three Strands in the Braid: A Guide for Enablers of Learning ...Select two items to be buried under the roots to symbolize national unity and peace. In the original ceremony, weapons of war were buried...(Another book by the author of Three Strands in the Braid features cover art depicting Benjamin Franklin sitting under a Tree of Peace and negotiating with a chief in the Iroquois Grand Council.)

References

External links
Trackingproject.org - The Tree of Peace in Hawaii, 1990 thru 2009

Native American organizations
Native American religion
Iroquois
American anti-war activists
Peace churches
Non-profit organizations based in New York (state)
Organizations established in 1984